Lord Baltimore may refer to:

People

Fictional persons
Lord Henry Baltimore, eponymous character of the Baltimore by Mike Mignola and Christopher Golden
Lord Baltimore, Indian tracker in feature film Butch Cassidy and the Sundance Kid (1969)

Nobility
Baron Baltimore, an extinct title in the Peerage of Ireland: 
George Calvert, 1st Baron Baltimore (1580–1632)
Cecil Calvert, 2nd Baron Baltimore (Lord Baltimore), the original namesake of the City of Baltimore, Maryland and adjacent Baltimore County
Charles Calvert, 3rd Baron Baltimore (1637–1715)
Benedict Calvert, 4th Baron Baltimore (1679–1715)
Charles Calvert, 5th Baron Baltimore (1699–1751)
Frederick Calvert, 6th Baron Baltimore (1731–1771)

Other uses
Baltimore and Ohio No. 2 Lord Baltimore, steam locomotive of the Baltimore and Ohio Railroad
Lord Baltimore Hotel, on West Baltimore and North Hanover Streets, in downtown Baltimore, Maryland
"Lord Baltimore" (The Blacklist), an episode of the American TV series The Blacklist

Music
Sir Lord Baltimore, an American heavy metal band
 Sir Lord Baltimore (album), 1971 eponymous album
 Sir Lord Baltimore III Raw, 2006 album

See also
 Baltimore (disambiguation)